This article is an annotated list of candidates associated with the 2008 Democratic Party presidential primaries for the 2008 United States presidential election.

Delegate counts 
Delegate statistics:
Total number of delegates: 4050 (797 unpledged super delegates and 3,253 pledged elected delegates)
Delegates required for nomination: 2118

Nominee

Withdrew during the primary elections

Withdrew before primary elections

Other candidates 
The following people filed with the Federal Elections Commission (FEC):
Willie Carter
Randy Crow
Phil Epstein
Michael Forrester
Henry Hewes
D.R. Hunter
Keith Russell Judd
Karl Krueger
Frank Lynch
Lee L. Mercer Jr.
Grover Cleveland Mullins
Larry Reed

Declined to run for party nomination

See also
 2008 Democratic National Convention
 2008 Democratic Party vice presidential candidate selection
 Nationwide opinion polling for the 2008 United States presidential election
 2008 Republican Party presidential candidates
 Third-party and independent candidates for the 2008 United States presidential election
 Timeline of the 2008 United States presidential election

References

External links 
List of all 2008 candidates for President at Project Vote Smart
PoliticalCompass.org's non-biased chart of each candidate and how they compare to each other

 
Democratic Party (United States) politicians
2008 United States Democratic presidential primaries